Conocephalus fasciatus, the slender meadow katydid, is a species of katydid of the family Tettigoniidae that is native to the United States and Canada.

Habitat
Conocephalus fasciatus is commonly found year-round throughout the United States and in the southern parts of Canada. They are commonly found in grassy and weedy areas in a large range of habitats including pastures, open pine woods and roadsides.

Diet
The diet of C. fasciatus mainly consists of grasses and grass seedheads, which are readily available in their habitats.

Identification
It is a small, slender katydid with long, narrow wings that extend beyond its posterior.  On average, C. fasciatus are 18–26 mm in length and are usually a combination of brown and green in color. In males, the cerci are green and have a stout tooth on the inner border as well as a tip that is weakly flattened. They have a straight ovipositor that is two-thirds the length of the hind femur.  The Slender Meadow Katydid has a soft song that is a sequence of alternating ticks and buzzes that vary in duration from 1–20 seconds.

References

fasciatus